Aiman Cahyadi (born 16 November 1993) is an Indonesian cyclist, who currently rides for UCI Continental team .

Major results

2012
 8th Overall Tour de Ijen
2013
 1st  Road race, National Road Championships
 5th Road race, Southeast Asian Games
 8th Overall Tour de Singkarak
 9th Time trial, Asian Under-23 Road Championships
2014
 9th Time trial, Asian Under-23 Road Championships
2015
 9th Overall Tour de Ijen
2016
 8th Tour de Jakarta
2017
 1st  Overall Tour de Siak
1st Stage 1
 8th Overall Tour de Molvccas
 9th Overall Tour de Selangor
1st Stage 3
 9th Overall Jelajah Malaysia
 10th Road race, Southeast Asian Games
2018
 5th Overall Tour de Lombok Mandalika
1st  Points classification
 Asian Games
7th Time trial
9th Road race
 7th Overall Tour de Indonesia
2019
 Southeast Asian Games
1st  Time trial
2nd  Team road race
2nd  Team time trial
10th Road race
 National Road Championships
1st  Time trial
4th Road race
 1st Stage 2 Tour de Ijen
 4th Overall Tour of Quanzhou Bay
 6th Overall Tour de Filipinas
 7th Overall PRUride Philippines
 9th Overall Tour de Indonesia
2020
 5th Overall Cambodia Bay Cycling Tour
2021
 5th Time trial, National Road Championships
2022
 1st  Road Race, National Road Championships
 Southeast Asian Games
2nd  Road race
2nd  Time trial
2023
 1st  Mountains classification, Tour of Sharjah

References

External links

1993 births
Living people
Indonesian male cyclists
Competitors at the 2019 Southeast Asian Games
Southeast Asian Games medalists in cycling
Southeast Asian Games gold medalists for Indonesia
Southeast Asian Games silver medalists for Indonesia
Cyclists at the 2014 Asian Games
Cyclists at the 2018 Asian Games
Asian Games competitors for Indonesia
Competitors at the 2021 Southeast Asian Games
21st-century Indonesian people